Vjekoslav or Vekoslav is a male Slavic given name, meaning "glorious through the ages" .

People
Vjekoslav Banovic - Croatian Australian football player
Vjekoslav Bastl - Croatian architect
Vjekoslav Bevanda - Former prime minister of Bosnia and Herzegovina
Vjekoslav Lujo Čukela - Croatian American Marine
Vjekoslav Ćurić - Croatian priest and humanitarian
Vekoslav Grmič - Slovenian Roman Catholic bishop and theologian
Vjekoslav Heinzel - Mayor of Zagreb
Vjekoslav Karas - Croatian painter
Vjekoslav Klaić - Croatian historian and writer
Vjekoslav Luburić - Croatian Ustasha World War 2 concentration camp commandant
Vjekoslav Pasković - Montenegrin water polo player
Vjekoslav Perica - Croatian historian, journalist and writer
Vjekoslav Servatzy - Croatian politician and Ustaša general
Vjekoslav Spinčić - Croatian politician
Vjekoslav Škrinjar - Croatian footballer
Vjekoslav Šutej - Croatian orchestral conductor
Vjekoslav Tomić - Croatian footballer
Vjekoslav Vrančić - Croatian NDH Undersecretary for the interior minister
Vjekoslav Vrdoljak - Croatian cinematographer
Vjekoslav Župančić - Croatian footballer

References

Croatian masculine given names